This is a list of films, television serials and programmes related to Islamic civilization, i.e. Islam, Islamic history and Islamic culture. For ease of classification this article defines the following terms as such:
"Documentary" refers to educational films and series of an informative nature.
"Film" refers to dramatic films following a narrative/story.
"Television" refers to serials, programmes and dramas that consist of more than one episode.

Children's / animated films

Short films
1001 Inventions and the Library of Secrets, featuring Ben Kingsley as Al-Jazari.

Religion

General

Documentary
Islam: Empire of Faith (PBS, 2000) on the life of Mohammed, spread of Islam, and the rise and fall of Islamic civilizations
Inside Islam (History Channel, 2002).
Inside Mecca (National Geographic, 2003) on the Hajj.
Ten Days (2007), an independent ethnomusicological film about the Ashura festival in Pakistan.
Let's Discover Eid al-Adha (2014), French documentary on the Islamic festival of Eid al-Adha.
One Day in the Haram (2017) on the Grand Mosque in the Holy Sanctuary at Makkah.
The Muslim Jesus (ITV, 2007) on the Islamic view of Jesus.
 Koran by Heart (HBO, 2011) on the annual children's Quran recitation contest held in Cairo.

Television
If he were among us (2011)
Understanding Islam (2011)
Ramadan Roundup (2011)

Film
Yusuf ile Züleykha (Turkey-Iran, 1970) based on the Islamic account of Joseph.
Ayyub e Payambar (Iran, 1993) based on the Islamic account of Job.
Saint Mary (Iran, 2002) based on the Islamic account of Mary, mother of Jesus.
The Messiah (Iran, 2007) based on the Islamic account of  Jesus Christ.
 Abraham: The Friend of God (Iran, 2008) based on the Islamic account of Abraham.
The Kingdom of Solomon (Iran, 2010) based on the Islamic account of the Israelite prophet-king Solomon.

Television
 The Men of Angelos (Iran, 1997) based on the Islamic tradition of the Sleepers in the Cave described in Surah Al-Kahf.
Prophet Joseph (Iran, 2008) based on the Islamic account of Joseph.

Life of Muhammad

Documentary
Muhammad: Legacy of a Prophet (PBS, 2002) on Muhammad as seen by Muslims.
The Life of Muhammad (BBC, 2011) on the life of Muhammad.

Film
The Message (1976), a film on the life of Muhammad.
Muhammad: The Messenger of God (Iran, 2015) based on the early life of Muhammad. This film is controversial due to depiction of Islamic prophets amongst Muslims. See aniconism in Islam.
The Lady of Heaven (2021 film), a film on the life of the Prophet and his daughter, Fatima.

Television
Muhammad: The Final Legacy (2008), Arab series also known as Qamar Bani Hashim.
Khaybar (2013), Arab series on the events of the Battle of Khaybar.

Sufism 

 A Door to the Sky (Morocco, 1982), about a woman who opens a Sufi shelter for women
 You Will Die at Twenty (Sudan, 2019)

History

Early History

Documentary
Islam: Empire of Faith (PBS, 2000) on the History of Islam, narrated by Sir Ben Kingsley.
An Islamic History of Europe (BBC, 2005) on the history of Islam in Europe, presented by Rageh Omaar.
What the Ancients Did for Us (BBC, 2005) Episode 1: The Islamic World.
Science and Islam (BBC, 2009) on Science in the medieval Islamic world featuring Jim Al-Khalili.
 The Noon of the 10th Day (Iran, 1988) on the Shia Muslim practice of Mourning on the 10th of Muharram.
When the Moors Ruled in Europe (Channel 4, 2005) on the history of Islamic Spain.
Cities of Light: The Rise and Fall of Islamic Spain (2007), on the civilisation of Islamic Spain.
The Caravan of the Andalusian Manuscripts (2007), Spanish documentary tracing the remnants of scientific manuscripts written in Andalusia.

Film
Khalid ibn el Walid (Egypt, 1958)
The Fateful Day (Iran, 1994)
Bohlol Dana - A Sage of Baghdad (India, 2010) about Bahlool, a companion of Imam Musa al-Kadhim.

Uwais Al Qarni (2013), film on the life of Tabi'i and Muslim saint Uwais Al-Qarni.
He Who Said No (Iran, 2014) on the Battle of Karbala and the martyrdom of Husayn ibn Ali.
The Empire (TV series) (India, 2021), a Disney+ Hotstar Web series based on Zahiruddin Muhammad Babur the founder of Mughal Empire.
Mulouk Al-Tawa'ef (Syria, 2005)

Television
Imam Ali Series (1992, Iran), a series about the life of Ali from becoming the Caliph to his assassination.
Loneliest Leader (1997, Iran), a series about the last of Hasan ibn Ali's life.
Velayate eshgh (2000, Iran), a series about Ali al-Ridha, the 8th Imam of Twelver Shi'ism.
Al Hajjaj (2003), an Arab series on Al-Hajjaj ibn Yusuf.
Khalid ibn al-Walid (2006), an Arab series on the life of Khalid ibn Walid.
Mokhtarnameh (2010, Iran), a series about the life of Muhktar al-Thaqsfi, the Battle of Karbala, and Hasan and Husayn.
Muawiya, Hassan and Hussein (2011), an Arab series on events during the lives of Hasan ibn Ali and Husayn ibn Ali.
Omar (2012), an Arab series on the life of the Second Rashidun Caliph, Umar ibn Khattab.
The Imam (2017), an Arab series on the life of the founder of the Hanbali school of law, Imam Ahmad ibn Hanbal.
Salman the Persian (2019, Iran), a series about the life of Salman the Persian, a companion of the Prophet.
The Sword of Tipu Sultan (1990, India), a historical drama that was first broadcast on the DD National in February 1990. This drama was a portrayal of the life and times of Tipu Sultan, the 18th century ruler of Mysore.
Jodha Akbar (2013, India), a TV series on Mughal Emperor Jalaluddin Akbar and his wife Mariam-uz-Zamani.
Shaheen (Urdu: The Falcon) (Pakistan, 1980), a series based on the historical novel by Naseem Hijazi depicting the Muslims in Spain and the Fall of Granada.
Saqr Qoraish (2002), an Arab series on Abd al-Rahman I and the founding of the Emirate of Cordoba.
Rabee' Qortoba (2003), an Arab series on the lives of Muslims living in Cordoba in Al-Andalus.

Crusades and Mongol Invasions

Documentary
The Sultan and the Saint (PBS, 2016) on the meeting of Egyptian Sultan Al-Kamil and St. Francis of Assisi.
The Crusades, An Arab Perspective (Al Jazeera, 2016) based on the book "The Crusades Through Arab Eyes" by Amin Maalouf.

Film
 Saladin the Victorious (Egypt, 1963) on Saladin, drawing parallels between him and Gamal Abdel Nasser.
 Melikşah (Turkey-Iran, 1969)
 Selahattin Eyyubi (Turkey-Iran, 1970)
 Kingdom of Heaven (2005), Western film on the Crusades, well-received in the Islamic World for its positive representation of Islam and Muslims.
 Direniş Karatay (Turkey, 2018) depicts Celâleddin Karatay and Ahi Evren.
Malazgirt 1071 based on the Battle of Malazgirt.

TelevisionAakhri Chataan (Urdu: The Last Rock) (Pakistan, 1985), a series based on the historical novel of the same name by Naseem Hijazi depicting the Mongol Invasion of the Khwarazm Sultanate and the subsequent Fall of Baghdad.Salah Al-deen Al-Ayyobi (2001), an Arab series on Saladin and the Crusades.Al-Zahir Bibars (2005), an Arab series on Mamluk Sultan Baibars.Uyanış: Büyük Selçuklu (2020), a Turkish series on the life of Malik-Shah I and his son Ahmad Sanjar of the Seljuk Empire.Mendirman Jaloliddin (Turkey, 2021), a series based on Jalal al-Din Mangburni and Mongol invasions.Selahaddin Eyyubi (2022), a Pakistani-Turkish series on Saladin and the Crusades.

Ottomans
DocumentaryThe Ottomans: Europe's Muslim Emperors (BBC, 2013) on the Ottoman Empire.Rise of Empires: Ottoman (Netflix, 2020)

FilmAl Hilal (India, 1935) on the Byzantine–Ottoman Wars.The Conquest of Constantinople (Turkey, 1951) on the Conquest of Constantinople.Fetih 1453 (Turkey, 2012) on the conquest of Constantinople by Sultan Mehmet II.

Television Fatih (Turkey, 2013) on the life of Sultan Mehmet II (Muhammad Fatih).Muhteşem Yüzyıl (Turkey, 2011) on the life of Ottoman Sultan Suleiman the Magnificent & Muhteşem Yüzyıl: Kösem (Turkey, 2015) on the life of Kösem Sultan.The Last Emperor (Turkey, 2017) on the reign of the 34th Ottoman Sultan, Abdul Hamid II and the Fall of the Ottoman Empire.Kingdoms of Fire (2019) is an Arab Series on Ottoman Empire and Mamluk Sultanate.Diriliş: Ertuğrul (2014) and the sequel, Kuruluş: Osman (2019), Turkish series on Ertuğrul, Osman Gazi, and the founding of the Ottoman Empire.
 Barbaros: Sword of the Mediterranean (Turkey, 2021) on the life of Hayreddin Barbarossa, an Ottoman admiral of 16th century.

Biopic
Documentary
 Al-Ghazali: The Alchemist of Happiness (2004), on the life of Islamic scholar Al-Ghazali.
 Prince Among Slaves (PBS, 2006) on the life of African Muslim enslaved in Mississippi, Abdul Rahman Ibrahima Sori.
 A Road to Mecca - The Journey of Muhammad Asad (2008) on the life and conversion of Muhammad Asad.
 Journey to Mecca (National Geographic, 2009) on the travels of Ibn Battuta.
 The Man Who Walked Across the World (BBC Four).  Series of documentary travelogues following in the footsteps of 14th Century Moroccan scholar Ibn Battuta, who covered 75,000 miles, 40 countries and three continents in a 30-year odyssey.

FilmLion of the Desert (Libya, 1981) on the life of Omar Mukhtar.Malcolm X (1992), American film on the life, conversion and Hajj of Malcolm X.Free Man (Turkey, 2011) on the life of Bediüzzaman Said Nursi.
Les Hommes libres (Free Men, 2011, France), on the life of Si Kaddour Benghabrit.

TelevisionAl-Tabari (Egypt, 1987) on the life of Muslim historian and exegete, Ibn Jarir al-Tabari.Roof of the World (Syria, 2007) on the journeys of medieval Arab traveller Ahmad ibn Fadlan.The Ladder of the Sky (Iran, 2009) on Persian astronomer Jamshid Kashani.

SufismYunus Emre: Aşkin Yolculuğu (Turkey, 2015) on Turkish Sufi poet Yunus Emre.Mavera (Turkey, 2021) on the life of Turkish Sufi Ahmad Yasawi.Haci Bayram Veli: Aşkin Yolculuğu (2022) a Turkish series on the life of Sufi Haji Bayram Veli.

Culture

General

Documentary
Nations Cultures - Muslims (Iran, 1994) showcasing the life and cultures of Muslims in various countries.
On a Tightrope (2007), Uyghur documentary on the experience of Uyghur Muslims in China.
Veiled Ambition (2007)
Seven Wonders of the Muslim World (PBS, 2008)
Müezzin (2009), Turkish documentary about the annual Turkish competition for the best muezzin.
Islamic Art: Mirror of the Invisible World (PBS, 2012) on the development of Islamic art and architecture.

Film
Semum (Turkey, 2008) horror film dealing with subjects of devils and Exorcism in Islam.
Munafik (2016) and Munafik 2 (2018), Malaysian horror films dealing with subjects of Jinn and Exorcism in Islam.

Television
All-American Muslim (TLC, 2011)

Comedy

Documentary
 The Muslims Are Coming! (2013)

Film
 Looking for Comedy in the Muslim World (2005)
 Mecca I'm Coming (2019)

Television
 Little Mosque on the Prairie (CBC, 2007)
 Citizen Khan (BBC, 2012)

See also
 Muhammad in film

References

 
Television series about Islam
Documentary films about Islam
Islamic animated films